The Orgasm Answer Guide is a 2009 book by Beverly Whipple, Barry R. Komisaruk, Sara Nasserzadeh and Carlos Beyer-Flores in which the authors pose 84 questions and answers pertaining to orgasm and other aspects of human sexuality.
The book is a winner of 2010 AASECT Book Award.
It is a more accessible version of the book The Science of Orgasm (2006).

Reception
Susan Quilliam calls this book "thoroughly" recommended and believes that it "brings together in a single work all human knowledge about orgasms."

References

External links 
 The Orgasm Answer Guide

2009 non-fiction books
English-language books
Johns Hopkins University Press books
Non-fiction books about sexuality
Books about orgasm